Alley Oop is a syndicated comic strip and its main character, created by V.T. Hamlin in 1932.

Alley Oop may also refer to: 

"Alley Oop" (song), written in 1957 by Dallas Frazier
Alley-oop (basketball), a play in basketball
Alley-oop (American football), a play in American football
Alley Oop (professional wrestling), a professional wrestling move
Alley-oop (skateboarding), a skateboarding trick
Alley-oop (skating), an inline skating trick

See also
 Allez Oop
 OOP (disambiguation)